Kachche Dhaage is a 1999 Indian Hindi-language action thriller film directed by Milan Luthria and starring Ajay Devgn, Saif Ali Khan and Manisha Koirala. The film features Devgan as a smuggler, delivering goods across the Rajasthan-Pakistan border, was filmed in the deserts of Rajasthan and in Switzerland. It premiered on 19 February 1999 in Mumbai.

Plot
Dhananjay (Saif Ali Khan) and Aaftab (Ajay Devgn) are two half-brothers who meet for the first time. Each one has a selfish approach to life; Aaftab is a petty smuggler, specializing in smuggling goods across the Rajasthan border into Pakistan whilst Dhananjay is a corporate yuppy from the city, with a high-flying lifestyle. Aaftab is in love with Rukshana (Manisha Koirala) but is rejected by her family because he is illegitimate. Dhananjay is dating Ragini (Namrata Shirodkar) and has his father's death to contend with.

When the brothers meet for the first time, they instantly loathe each other, having nothing in common. One night, Aaftab blows up a loaded truck while trying to steal from it and attracts a mass of unwanted enforcers. Soon, Aaftab is forced to send Dhananjay into a trap but ends up with them both being handcuffed and escaping from the Border Security Force, the Central Bureau of Investigation, and the border mafia who are attempting to incriminate the brothers for anti-national activities and murder. Fate has it such that they are forced to escape on foot, on motorbikes, cars, stolen trucks, and even handcuffed to each other on a moving goods train. They run into difficult circumstances on the run, not in the least made better by their hatred for each other.  Despite their initial differences, the two gradually learn to like and understand each other, eventually proving their innocence.

The climax of this film was shot around Jaisalmer, especially in Kuldhara, the deserted village of Paliwal Brahmins.

Cast
 Ajay Devgn as Aftab
 Saif Ali Khan as Dhananjay Pandit "Jai"
 Manisha Koirala as Rukhsana 
 Namrata Shirodkar as Ragini Pandit
 Sadashiv Amrapurkar as CBI Officer Jadeja
 Govind Namdeo as Rana Baikunth
 Maya Alagh as Mariam
 Anupam Shyam as Ramakant Pandit
 Vineet Kumar as Bhagta
 Anu Kapoor as Kawali singer (Cameo appearance) in Is Shaan-e-Karam Ka Kya Kehna
 Parmeet Sethi (Cameo appearance) in Khali Dil Nahi  
 Simran (Cameo appearance) in Khali Dil Nahi 
 Mahavir Shah as Lawyer Chinoy
 Rajeev Verma as Justice Nariman Sohrab
 Rajesh Vivek as Noora
 Ishrat Ali as Maulvi

Reception

Critical response
Suparn Verma of Rediff.com described Devgan as "effective" but disapproved of Koirala's performance, believing it was wasted. Verma noted a similarity with that of Soldier (1998) in that film too there was a troubled hero, a great many red herrings and a mysterious villain who pulls all the strings, but critics believed that Kachche Dhaage was a weaker film because it lacked the pace and focus.

Box office
The film was a box office success grossing 277 million at the domestic box office.

Soundtrack
The soundtrack, which featured a number of Punjabi folk tunes, proved popular amongst non Hindi audiences of the film. The music was composed by Ustad Nusrat Fateh Ali Khan, with lyrics by Anand Bakshi. The song "Tere Bin Nahin Jeena" sung by Lata Mangeshkar is a cover version of Nusrat Fateh Ali Khan's famous Qawwali song "Tere Bin Nahin Lagda".

"Band Lifafa Dil Mera" – Lata Mangeshkar, Kumar Sanu
"Ek Jawani Teri" – Kumar Sanu, Alka Yagnik
"Upar Khuda Aasmaan Neeche" – Female – Lata Mangeshkar
"Upar Khuda Aasmaan Neeche" – Male – Sukhwinder Singh
"Dil Pardesi Ho Gaya" – Lata Mangeshkar, Kumar Sanu
"Khali Dil Nahi" – Alka Yagnik, Hans Raj Hans
"Pyar Nahi Karna" -Kumar Sanu, Alka Yagnik
"Is Shaan-e-Karam Ka Kya Kehna" – Ustad Nusrat Fateh Ali Khan
"Tere Bin Nahin Jeena" – Lata Mangeshkar

References

External links 
 

1999 films
Indian action thriller films
1990s Hindi-language films
1999 action thriller films
Films scored by Nusrat Fateh Ali Khan
Films shot in Switzerland
1999 directorial debut films
Films directed by Milan Luthria